Moldova–Sweden relations are the bilateral relations between the two countries, Moldova and Sweden.  Moldova has an embassy in Stockholm.  Sweden has an embassy in Chișinău.

Both countries are full members of the Council of Europe and the Organization for Security and Co-operation in Europe.

Swedish assistance
Sweden is one of Moldova's top donors. From 1996, Sweden provided Moldova with technical assistance worth 30 million dollars, which significantly helped strengthen sectors such as: protection of human rights, democracy, good governance, public health, education, agriculture, energy, infrastructure, transport and the private sector. Much of the aid is delivered through the Swedish International Development Agency.

In 2007, the Swedish Government established the 2007–2010 strategy of cooperation with Moldova, which sees 11 million euros in financial assistance annually for three important sectors: good governance, strengthening of competitiveness in the rural area and reduction of vulnerability in the energy sector.

See also 
 Foreign relations of Moldova
 Foreign relations of Sweden

References

 
Sweden
Bilateral relations of Sweden